Max Bromme (18 August 1878, Grünberg, Silesia – 9 September 1974 in Frankfurt) was a German architect and horticulturist. He was the  director of horticulture (from 1912 to 1945), and also director of the Palm House from 1932 to 1945 in Frankfurt.
He envisioned first concepts to preserve the Nidda in 1925, by creating a surrounding area as a green free space between town center and the new settlements of the New Frankfurt-project, together with Ernst May. A well-known example of his work is the successful transition between city and landscape known as the Römerstadt. His work was also part of the art competitions at the 1928 Summer Olympics and the 1932 Summer Olympics.

Completed Projects
 Park at the Bornheimer Hang, a hillside in Frankfurt-Bornheim
 IG Farben Building-parks
 Extension of the Hauptfriedhof Frankfurt (Main cemetery)
 Brentanopark
 Holzhausenpark
 Solmspark
 Rothschild- and Goldschmidtpark
 Waldstadion Frankfurt
 Westhausen Estate
 Römerstadt Estate
 Huthpark
 Lohrpark

References

1878 births
1974 deaths
People from Zielona Góra
19th-century German architects
People from the Province of Silesia
Olympic competitors in art competitions
20th-century German architects